Eloise Jayne "Ellie" Wilson (born 11 May 1997) is an English footballer who plays as a defender for FA Women's Championship club Sheffield United. She previously played for Reading F.C. and London Bees. She has represented England on the under-19 and under-23 national teams.

Playing career

Reading F.C., 2014–2015 
Wilson played for Reading F.C. for the 2015 FA WSL season. She made two appearances for the team. Reading finished in first place with a  record securing promotion to FA WSL 1 for the 2016 season.

Bristol City, 2016–2018 
Wilson signed with Bristol City in January 2016 ahead of the 2016 FA WSL season. She made 11 appearances for the team and helped secure a second-place result with a  record and promotion to FA WSL 1.

International 
Wilson has represented England on the under-19 national team. In 2016, she was called up to training for the under-20 national team.

Honours 
 with Reading F.C.
 FA WSL 2 Winner: 2015
 with Bristol City
 FA WSL 2 Runner-up: 2016

See also

References

Further reading
 Caudwell, Jayne (2011), Women's Football in the UK: Continuing with Gender Analyses, Routledge, 
 Grainey, Timothy (2012), Beyond Bend It Like Beckham: The Global Phenomenon of Women's Soccer, University of Nebraska Press, 
 Scraton, S., Magee, J., Caudwell, J. (2008), Women, Football and Europe: Histories, Equity and Experience (Ifi) (Vol 1), Meyer & Meyer Fachverlag und Buchhandel GmbH, 
 Stewart, Barbara (2012), Women's Soccer: The Passionate Game, Greystone Books, 
 Williams, Jean (2003), A Game for Rough Girls?: A History of Women's Football in Britain, Routledge,

External links 
 
 Bristol City player profile
 

1997 births
Living people
Women's Super League players
Bristol Academy W.F.C. players
London Bees players
English women's footballers
Women's association football defenders
Reading F.C. Women players
Sportspeople from Windsor, Berkshire
Sheffield United W.F.C. players
Women's Championship (England) players
Footballers from Berkshire